The Adventures of Count Bobby (German: Die Abenteuer des Grafen Bobby) is a 1961 Austrian comedy film directed by Géza von Cziffra and starring Peter Alexander, Vivi Bach and Gunther Philipp. It was the first in a trilogy of films featuring the character Count Bobby.

The film's sets were designed by the art directors Fritz Jüptner-Jonstorff and Alexander Sawczynski. It was shot at the Sievering Studios in Vienna.

Cast
 Peter Alexander as Graf Bobby von Pinelski 
 Vivi Bach as Mary Piper 
 Gunther Philipp as Baron Mucki von Kalk 
 Susi Nicoletti as Mrs. Evelyn Piper 
 Bill Ramsey as Bill, der Kellner 
 Hubert von Meyerinck as Mr. Cower 
 Adrienne Gessner as Gräfin Henriette von Ratzeberg 
 Oskar Sima as Mr. Donald Piper 
 Fritz Muliar as Josef Powidel, Wiener Gangster 
 Rolf Olsen as Direktor Eisenbauer 
 Sieglinde Thomas as Telefonistin in einem Wiener Hotel 
 Alma Seidler as Madame Lussac 
 C.W. Fernbach as Dr. Kajetan 
 Boy Gobert as Slippery, Gangster aus Chicago 
 Raoul Retzer as Barkeeper 
 Rose Renée Roth as Schlossbesucherin 
 Dany Sigel as Flugbegleiterin 
 Elisabeth Stiepl as Schlossbesucherin

References

Bibliography 
 Robert von Dassanowsky. Austrian Cinema: A History. McFarland, 2005.

External links 
 

1961 films
1961 musical comedy films
Austrian musical comedy films
1960s German-language films
Films directed by Géza von Cziffra
Cross-dressing in film
Films shot at Sievering Studios
Sascha-Film films
Constantin Film films